Alice Cooper: The Nightmare was a conceptual television special showcasing the music of the Welcome to My Nightmare album by Alice Cooper. It originally broadcast in North America on April 25, 1975, by ABC.

In the TV special, Alice Cooper stars as "Steven" who is trapped in a nightmare he can't wake up from and tries to escape. Vincent Price also appears throughout the special, starring as the "Spirit of the Nightmare". The special features the Welcome To My Nightmare album in its entirety, with the addition of the song "Ballad of Dwight Fry" from the album Love It to Death by the original Alice Cooper band.

In 1983 the TV special was released on VHS and Betamax home video in the US.

The TV special was released on DVD/Blu-ray titled Welcome to My Nightmare: Special Edition on September 8, 2017, which also serves as a re-release of the 1976 concert film Welcome to My Nightmare.

Trivia

This special won an Emmy in 1976 for Outstanding Achievement in Video Tape Editing for a Special.
Its home video release gained a Grammy Awards nomination for Best Video Album in 1984 (it lost to Duran Duran).
When it was originally broadcast on television in 1975, the lyrics to "Only Women Bleed" were slightly changed. A portion of this version is featured on the Alice Cooper: Prime Cuts video, which was initially released in 1991.

Track listing
 "Welcome to My Nightmare"
 "Devil's Food"
 "Some Folks"
 "Only Women Bleed"
 "Cold Ethyl"
 "The Black Widow"
 "Years Ago"
 "Department of Youth"
 "Years Ago (Reprise)
 "Steven"
 "The Awakening"
 "Ballad of Dwight Fry"
 "Escape"
 "The Awakening (Reprise)"
 "Credits"

References

Alice Cooper
Music television specials
1975 television specials
American Broadcasting Company television specials